The men's road race at the 1946 UCI Road World Championships was the 13th edition of the event. The race took place on Sunday 1 September 1946 in Zürich, Switzerland. The race was won by Hans Knecht of Switzerland.

Final classification

References

Men's Road Race
UCI Road World Championships – Men's road race